Lin Chau-tai (born 4 July 1938) is a Taiwanese athlete. She competed in the women's long jump at the 1960 Summer Olympics. She was the first woman to represent Taiwan at the Olympics.

References

1938 births
Living people
Athletes (track and field) at the 1960 Summer Olympics
Taiwanese female long jumpers
Olympic athletes of Taiwan
Place of birth missing (living people)